Antônio Carlos may refer to:

 Antônio Carlos Santos (born 1964), Brazilian footballer
 Antônio Carlos Zago (born 1969), Brazilian footballer
 Antônio Carlos (footballer, born 1979) (fl. 2003–2015), Brazilian footballer active in Vietnam, see V.League 1
 Antônio Carlos (footballer, born 1983) (born 1983), played for Fluminense, Atlético Paranaense and São Paulo
 Antônio Carlos Júnior (born 1990), Brazilian mixed martial artist
 Antônio Carlos (footballer, born 1993) (born 1993), Brazilian footballer
 Antônio Carlos (footballer, born 1994) (born 1994), Brazilian footballer

Places 
 Antônio Carlos, Minas Gerais
 Antônio Carlos, Santa Catarina

See also 
 Carlos Antonio (disambiguation)